Yves Bouvier (born 8 September 1963 in Geneva, Switzerland) is a Swiss businessman and art dealer best known for his role in the Bouvier Affair that resulted in criminal charges being brought against him in France and Monaco. He was the president of Natural Le Coultre, an international company specialized in the transportation, storage, scientific analysis, and conservation of works of art, luxurious goods and other collectibles.

In September 2017, it emerged that Bouvier is under criminal investigation by Swiss authorities amid allegations that he may have evaded more than 100 million euros in taxes related to his cross-border art dealings. In February 2018, meanwhile, the Geneva Prosecutor reportedly opened a new criminal investigation into Bouvier relating to an indictment on charges of fraud.

Early life
Yves Bouvier is the son of Jean-Jacques Bouvier, owner of Natural Le Coultre, a 150-year-old company specialized in moving and storing goods. Yves Bouvier early developed an interest in art, and dropped out of college to join his father's company in the eighties.

Business career

Natural Le Coultre
Natural Transports was formed in 1859 as a moving and furniture storage company. It later became Natural Le Coultre in 1901, when Albert-Maurice Natural joined Emile-Etienne Le Coultre to create A. Natural, Le Coultre & Cie. The company's office was located in Geneva. The firm was mainly dealing with commodity deliveries, including fruits, equipment and Red Cross parcels during the First World War.

In 1953, Jean-Jacques Bouvier began an apprenticeship at Natural Le Coultre S.A. 30 years later in 1983, the Bouvier family acquired Natural Le Coultre. In 1989, Jean-Jacques and Yves Bouvier formed Fine Art Transports Natural Le Coultre SA in Geneva, which provided moving and furniture storage services to the local companies. Hoping that Yves would keep leading the family business, Jean-Jacques Bouvier promoted his son to the position of assistant manager in 1995 and then managing director in 1997, selling the moving and furniture storage activities to a local company to focus the company on storing, moving, and preserving pieces of art. Yves Bouvier moved to Singapore in 2009 where he currently resides.

Under Bouvier's control, Natural Le Coultre owned 5 percent of the Geneva freeport, but the company was sold to André Chenue, a Parisian shipping firm, in 2017 for an undisclosed amount.

In 2017, in line with the investigation into Bouvier's potential tax-evasion, Federal Tax Administration (FTA) officials temporarily sequestered one of Natural Le Coultre's buildings in Geneva, worth 4.5 million Swiss francs.

Freeport facilities
Bouvier exported the freeport concept, and in 2005, expanded his business model abroad by creating "artistic hubs" grouped into freeport facilities that offer services and rental facilities to art collectors, museums and companies, expanding into Singapore in 2010 and Luxembourg in 2014. Another facility was planned in Shanghai for 2017, though the project has been suspended.

The freeports have been subject of increased scrutiny by authorities and governments in recent years. For example, a study by the European Parliament’s think tank described their high security and discretion as a risk for tax evasion and money laundering. A European Commission report also concluded that these facilities "could be abused for trade of counterfeited goods, money laundering and other crime if no sufficient checks are carried out to identify the owners of companies using them." Furthermore, a 2016 UNESCO report detailed the possibility that freeports can be used by art dealers to trade stolen, looted or illegally excavated objects, even many years later. The facilities have been alleged to be a point of sale for expensive art, for example, to museums.

Geneva Freeport 

The oldest freeport facility, the Swiss government holds the majority stake of 85 percent with Bouvier holding a 5 percent stake. Bouvier sold his majority participation in 2017, after the Swiss government passed stricter oversight rules over customs warehouses. According to media reports, the freeport has been linked to the trafficking of looted artifacts from Syria, and is regarded as a risk for money-laundering and tax-evasion operations by the European Union.

Singapore Freeport 

Bouvier built a subsidiary to the Geneva freeport in Singapore in 2010, after the idea was floated with the Singaporean government as early as 2005. The facilities host primarily works of art, but vintage cars, wine, jewelry, and gold bars of Deutsche Bank until July 2019, when the bank ceased its usage of the facility. Unlike in Geneva's freeport, in which Bouvier is a minority stakeholder, he holds a majority stake in the Singapore facility, describing the idea of the facility a "great success." However, the Singapore freeport has been for sale since 2017 but a buyer is yet to be found.

Luxembourg Freeport 

The freeport was inaugurated on 17 September 2014. It has been under criticism from the EU since 2018, when it was found to be an enabler for tax evasion by two MEPs. German MEP Wolf Klinz in 2019 demanded the freeport be closed for its alleged role in facilitating money laundering and tax evasion. After another visit to the facility later that year, several more MEPs echoed the call to phase out freeports across the EU, calling them a “black hole” beyond the authorities’ control.

Other contributions
In 2004 Bouvier founded the company Art Culture Studio that organizes cultural events, restores furniture, and provides support to the Renaissance Foundation for Russian Country Homes, a non-profit organization that supports research on the restoration of cultural and historic buildings in rural areas. Art Culture Studio helped renovate the 18th century furniture for the boudoir of Empress Josephine in 2012.

He initiated and chaired the Moscow World Fine Art Fair in 2004, a yearly exhibition taking place in May for art dealers and collectors. He also contributed to the establishment of the Salzburg World Fine Art Fair.

In 2015, Bouvier initiated the creation of the Singapore Pinacothèque de Paris, an expansion of Pinacothèque de Paris. The museum was closed in 2016 without explanation. Art Heritage Singapore, the company behind the project and of which Bouvier was a shareholder, was subsequently sued by media and security companies involved in the project for almost $900,000.

Bouvier was involved with the "pôle R4" project, an artistic "micro-city" on the site of a former Renault factory in Seguin Island, Paris. The project, designed by French architect Jean Nouvel, was until September 2016 managed and financed by Bouvier, and was scheduled to open in 2017. In September 2016 it was announced that Bouvier had sold his entire stake to the Emerige Group and its financial partner, Addax and Oryx Group Limited (AOG). Artnet noted that the transaction frees the project from its association from Bouvier.

Lawsuits

Dispute with Dmitry Rybolovlev
In 2015, Russian billionaire Dmitry Rybolovlev accused Yves Bouvier of defrauding him out of nearly $1 billion via the sale of artwork at inflated prices while he was employed as a consultant and was receiving a commission of 2 percent on the value of each purchase. The dispute over 38 works of art gave rise to civil and criminal litigation in Singapore, Switzerland, France, Monaco, China and the United States.

Bouvier has denied all accusations and maintained that as an independent art dealer he was free to set his own commission, whereas Rybolovlev's lawyers claim a commission of 2 percent had been agreed.

Yves Bouvier met Rybolovlev for the first time in 2003, when he came to see him for the occasion of the delivery of the Marc Chagall painting, Le Cirque. Tania Rappo, a friend of the Rybolovlev family, organized the purchase of Marc Chagall's Le Cirque painting for $6 million. When the painting arrived at the premises of Natural Le Coultre, located in the Geneva freeport, the canvas did not have a certificate of authenticity guaranteeing that the artwork was an original. Rybolovlev feared he had been scammed, but Bouvier acquired the certificate a few days later and requested Rappo to organize a meeting with the Rybolovlev at their home in Cologny. Rybolovlev did not know then that the Finatrading company, which had sold him the Chagall, was in fact the property of Yves Bouvier. Bouvier promised Rappo that he would give her a commission for every work sold to Rybolovlev, for introducing him to the billionaire. Bouvier subsequently acquired several paintings for Rybolovlev, including Vincent van Gogh, Pablo Picasso and Amedeo Modigliani.

According to Forbes, the Russian learned of the alleged fraud from Sandy Heller, an art adviser who had sold Modigliani's Nude on a blue cushion for $93.5 million to Bouvier, who then sold it to Rybolovlev for $118 million. This prompted Rybolovlev to file for fraud and money laundering in Monaco. Upon meeting Rybolovlev in Monaco nine days later, Bouvier was arrested.

On 26 February 2015, Bouvier was arrested in Monaco on suspicion of defrauding Dmitry Rybolovlev. Bouvier was released on a €10 million bail. The case is still ongoing. He is accused of fraud as a result of excessive margins on the sale of paintings, such as on Leonardo da Vinci's Salvator Mundi with a margin of €50 million. Rybolovlev learned from a New York Times article that the painting had been sold for $75 million in 2013, although he had paid Bouvier $127.5 million for it. Bouvier denied all accusations, argued that he first heard about the complaint was when he was arrested, and that the price of the paintings had been agreed by both parties. Bouvier denied all accusations. Bouvier also called for an investigation into HSBC’s provision of a letter to Monaco police that falsely stated that he and a co-defendant in a money laundering case, Tania Rappo, shared an account at the bank. HSBC responded that this was a simple and clerical mistake.

In addition, Rybolovlev's lawyer Tetiana Bersheda recorded a private conversation at the oligarch's house a few days before the arrest of Bouvier and Rappo. Following a complaint filed by Tania Rappo, Rybolovlev and Bersheda were briefly placed in police custody on 17 November 2015. On 23 February 2016, Bersheda was also charged by Monaco court for violation of the privacy of Rappo. Bersheda maintains that the recording concerned a professional conversation and was therefore authorized by Monegasque law.

On 13 March 2015, Singapore's High Court ordered the global freezing of Bouvier's assets, but it was reported that the assets were unfrozen in August of that year on the grounds that Rybolovlev's approach constituted an abuse of process. The High Court subsequently ordered the Russian to deposit $100 million to guarantee the amount of damages sustained by Bouvier and his companies due to the injunction.

After Rybolovlev had successfully obtained a Mareva injunction from Hong Kong's High Court in July 2015, on 4 September, Bouvier had his assets in Hong Kong unfrozen following a consent summons between Bouvier and two companies linked to Rybolovlev. High Court recorder Jason Pow Wing-nin SC ordered the injunction against art dealer Bouvier and his Hong Kong company Mei Invest Limited to be lifted.

In March 2016, the High Court of Singapore dismissed Bouvier's attempt to suspend the civil suit filed in the territory, but the case was transferred to the Singapore International Commercial Court, which deals specifically with cross-border commercial disputes. In May 2016, Bouvier's lawyers filed an appeal against the High Court's ruling, arguing the case should be heard in Switzerland rather than Singapore. On 18 April 2017, the Singapore Court of Appeal overturned the High Court's decision, ruling that the case should be heard in Switzerland and ordering the action in Singapore to be stayed.

On 9 March 2016, following the lead of European authorities, US Federal prosecutors opened an investigation into Bouvier, whom they described as "one of the art world’s consummate insiders." In April 2016, Bouvier entered a new phase of his campaign to clear his name by hiring global PR group, CNC Communications & Network Consulting, part of French giant Publicis Groupe.

In February 2018, a federal prosecutor in Geneva opened a criminal investigation into Yves Bouvier, accusing him of fraud to the detriment of Dmitry Rybolovlev.

Rybolovlev also accused auction house Sotheby's of being complicit in Bouvier's alleged defrauding scheme. Rybolovlev has alleged that Bouvier originally paid Sotheby's $80 million for the “Salvator Mundi” of Leonardo da Vinci, but sold it to Rybolovlev for $127 million, a significant mark-up. The Russian subsequently accused Sotheby's of having knowingly and willingly assisted in the fraud.

In June 2019 the US District Court for the Southern District of New York ordered that email exchanges between Bouvier and Sotheby's vice chairman of worldwide private sales Samuel Valette which were previously confidential due to Sotheby's motion to seal certain documents must be submitted to the court. Sotheby's was involved in the sale of 14 of the works in question.

The documents detailing correspondence between Bouvier and Sotheby's staff subsequently filed to the courts "reveal that Bouvier paid Sotheby’s $83 million for the work, suggesting a 53.62 percent markup as Rybolovlev had alleged." According to the files, the process involved a request from Yves Bouvier for Valette to send an evaluation approved by Sotheby's which was to be transferred to Rybolovlev, indicating that Bouvier and Valette apparently coordinated on the value of the appraisals which Bouvier then sent to his client. Bouvier subsequently purchased paintings - via Sotheby's - for amounts lower than those indicated in the valuation, before reselling them to Rybolovlev, mostly at prices higher than those indicated in the evaluation of the auction house. The transaction history that Sotheby's has provided for certain works omits sales to Bouvier, although Valette has personally been involved in many of these sales.

Both Bouvier and Sotheby's have denied any wrongdoing. In November 2018, Rybolovlev was charged in relation to a probe into influence peddling and corruption by prosecutors in Monaco.

On 13 November 2019, the New York Court of Appeals decided that Sotheby's had to provide documents requested in the context of proceedings initiated by foreign jurisdictions in which the auction house is involved, including for proceedings between Yves Bouvier and Dmitry Rybolovlev in Switzerland.

Other cases 
Bouvier was connected to a legal case involving a Canadian collector named Lorette Shefner in 2008. Shefner's family claims that she was the victim of a complex fraud, whereby she was persuaded to sell a Soutine painting at a price far below market value, only to see the work later sold to the National Gallery of Art in Washington DC for a much higher price. According to New York court papers from 2013, Bouvier was accused of having conspired "to disguise the true ownership" of pieces of art to defraud the Shefner estate.

In a separate incident, Bouvier's purported connections to Galerie Jacques de la Béraudière and his ownership of an off-shore entity called Diva Fine Arts led him to be connected to the case of Wolfgang Beltracchi, a German forger convicted in 2011 of defrauding a number of collectors, including Daniel Filipacchi, of millions of dollars. According to a media report, Bouvier came first in contact with Beltracchi via his wife Helene, to whom he was introduced through art expert Werner Spies, who had authenticated one of Beltracchi's paintings before they were sold on. Bouvier has denied any connection to Beltracchi and has dismissed media coverage as uninformed speculation.

On 30 March 2012, the Beijing office of one of Bouvier's subsidiary firms, art transporter IFAS, was raided by local tax authorities, leading to the arrest of several employees, including the general manager Nils Jennrich. Through his lawyer, Bouvier contested having affiliation with the company. With the efforts of German diplomats, Jennrich was released and returned to Germany in 2013, and the case was closed as well as the charges dropped.

On 14 September 2015, Bouvier was indicted on charges of concealed theft of two Picassos belonging to Catherine Hutin-Blay, step-daughter of Picasso, who claims that they were stolen from her collection. However, Bouvier demonstrated she received the amount of 8 million euros through a Liechtensteiner trust for their sales. The prosecution of Liechtenstein closed the case on 1 December 2015.

Bouvier and an associate, Marc Francelet, were also allegedly involved in helping former president of Angola, Jose Eduardo dos Santos, funnel Angolan state funds out of the country. According to Angolan press reports and French court documents, Bouvier and Francelet used two shell companies, Brave Ventures Pte Ltd and Francelet Consulting, to make the state funds disappear.

Panama Papers 
In the 2015 leak, it was revealed that Bouvier had at least five off-shore companies linked to him. A lawyer for Bouvier stated these are used for well-established legal purposes.

Alleged tax evasion 
In 2017, the Swiss Federal Tax Administration (FTA) initiated an investigation into Bouvier for tax evasion to the tune of CHF 165 million ($145 million) stemming mostly from income received through art deals with Rybolovlev and proceeds from companies in Hong Kong and the Virgin Islands that are allegedly tied to him. In June 2019, the FTA was granted access to documents seized during office raids, following Bouvier's attempt of blocking them.

On 3 August 2020, Switzerland's Federal Criminal Court ruled that some of the documents in question must be inspected, which subsequently led the authorities to accuse Bouvier of owing taxes on CHF 330 million ($360 million). At the core of the case is Bouvier's assertion that he has been a Singapore resident for the past decade and thus does not owe Swiss taxes on profits made since then. However, the authorities dispute this, arguing that Bouvier continues to be domiciled and conducting business in Switzerland.

Scherbakov case 
In 2018, another Russian businessman, who according to artnet news emerged to be Vladimir Shcherbakov filed a lawsuit against Yves Bouvier and his associate Thierry Hobaica, who according to media reports Bouvier had engaged to deal with Scherbakov. The Russian accused them of overcharging him in the purchase of 40 artworks, which were allegedly acquired through offshore firms owned by Bouvier.

Personal life 
Bouvier is a non-practicing Protestant, and is passionate about sailing boats “of all kinds”, as well as competition horses.

He settled in Singapore in 2008 where he currently resides, which is being contested by Swiss tax authorities saying he is still a Geneva resident.

According to French magazine Le Point, Yves Bouvier had allegedly been the patron of Zahia Dehar, a model and designer who had previously worked as a call girl. According to report, Bouvier allegedly organized dinners for his clients, with Dehar as the "guest star," while she was allegedly underage. She became known to the general public after being "offered" at the age of 17 as a birthday present to French footballer Frank Ribéry. The relationship between Yves Bouvier and Zahia Dehar caught the attention of the French press, but has been denied by both Bouvier and Dehar. A former escort colleague of Zahia, known as Sarah, claims that she and Zahia were part of an international pimping ring headed by Yves Bouvier.

See also
The Lost Leonardo, 2021 film in which Bouvier is interviewed

External links 
 Official website

References

Living people
Swiss art dealers
Businesspeople from Geneva
1963 births